Yazid Atouba (born 2 January 1993) is a Cameroonian footballer who plays as a midfielder, for Angolan football club Primeiro de Agosto.

Career

Club
After spending his early career in his native land of Cameroon, Atouba was drafted by the Chicago Fire of Major League Soccer on 17 January 2013 as the 30th overall pick in the 2013 MLS SuperDraft. Then after impressing coaches in Chicago's pre-season camps, Atouba was officially signed by the team on 1 March 2013. Then, just two days after signing his first professional contract, Atouba made his MLS debut in the Fire's first match of the season against the defending champions Los Angeles Galaxy at the Home Depot Center in Carson, California when he came on in the 70th minute for Joel Lindpere, however the Fire came out in the end with a 4–0 loss.

He was waived by the Fire in March 2014. On 31 January 2015, Atouba signed with Elite One champions Coton Sport. He remained there until July 2016 when he departed to join Linafoot side AS Vita Club in the DR Congo.

On 26 February 2019, Atouba was released by Maritzburg United.

In 2019–20, he signed in for Primeiro de Agosto in the Angolan league, the Girabola.

International
Atouba has represented Cameroon at U20 and senior level. He won four caps for the U20s while he has currently won five caps and scored two goals for the seniors, both goals and all but one appearance came during the 2016 African Nations Championship in Rwanda.

Career statistics

Club

International
.

International goals
. Scores and results list Cameroon's goal tally first.

References

External links 
 

1993 births
Living people
Footballers from Yaoundé
Cameroonian footballers
Girabola players
Major League Soccer players
Association football midfielders
Cameroonian expatriate footballers
Cameroonian expatriate sportspeople in South Africa
Cameroonian expatriate sportspeople in the United States
Cameroonian expatriate sportspeople in the Democratic Republic of the Congo
Cameroon under-20 international footballers
Cameroon international footballers
Expatriate footballers in Angola
Expatriate footballers in the Democratic Republic of the Congo
Expatriate soccer players in the United States
Expatriate soccer players in South Africa
AS Vita Club players
C.D. Primeiro de Agosto players
Canon Yaoundé players
Chicago Fire FC players
Chicago Fire FC draft picks
2016 African Nations Championship players
African Games bronze medalists for Cameroon
African Games medalists in football
Competitors at the 2011 All-Africa Games
Cameroon A' international footballers